Hypsotropa endorhoda is a species of snout moth in the genus Hypsotropa. It was described by George Hampson in 1918 and is known from Zimbabwe.

References

Moths described in 1918
Anerastiini